Genetic suppressor element 1 is a protein that in humans is encoded by the GSE1 gene.

References

Further reading